David Bradford may refer to:

 David Bradford (lawyer) (1760–1808), lawyer and deputy attorney-general for Washington County, Pennsylvania
 David Bradford (economist) (1939–2005), American economist and professor of economics and public affairs
 David Bradford (footballer) (born 1953), English retired football midfielder
 David Bradford (photographer) (born 1951), American photographer, video maker, and taxi driver
 David Cordley Bradford (1922–2002), British general practitioner
 David Bradford, a character played by Grant Goodeve in the TV series Eight Is Enough

See also
David Bradford House, historic house in Pennsylvania, USA, home of David Bradford, a leader of the Whiskey Rebellion